Pseudoklossia is a genus in the phylum Apicomplexa. Species in this genus infect marine molluscs, although one species (Pseudoklossia microcosmi) infects in an ascidian worm. The life cycle is heteroxenous (requires at least two hosts).

The species infecting molluscs tend to infect the renal tissue.

History

This genus was created by Leger and Duboscq in 1915.

Taxonomy

The type species is Pseudoklossia glomerata.

Description

The oocysts have numerous sporocysts. Each sporocyst generally has 2 sporozoites.

References

Apicomplexa genera